Zhob Division is an administrative division of Balochistan Province, Pakistan. It was created in 1988 bifurcated from Quetta division. It had been abolished between 2000 and 2008 during the military rule of Pervez Musharraf.

Loralai Division is carved after splitting Zhob Division, consisting of Barkhan District, Loralai District, Musakhail District and Duki District.

Districts 
The division contains the following districts:

 Zhob District
 Killa Saifullah District
 Sherani District

Demographics 
According to 2017 census, Zhob division had a population of 1,541,929, which includes 827,581 males and 714,299 females. 
Zhob division constitutes  850 Hindus, 1,537,680 Muslims,2,749 Christians followed by 482 Ahmadi and  168 others.

See also 
 Divisions of Pakistan

References

Divisions of Balochistan